Vardøger was a Christian extreme metal band from Hamar, Norway. Formed in 1994 under the name Hidden Paradise, the members of the band at the time were all involved in other musical projects and so treated Hidden Paradise as a side project. Several songs were written between 1995 and 1997, almost enough for an entire album, and the band changed its name to Vardøger, but the group disbanded before an album could be released. In 2000, the band contributed the symphonic black metal song "Footprints of Thunder" to the compilation album In the Shadow of Death: A Scandinavian Extreme Music Compilation. 

Vardøger reformed and eventually released an EP, Whitefrozen, in 2003 through Endtime Productions. The recording was received well by critics and is considered a classic. Stefan Lang of Powermetal.de said that the band had a real potential to grow beyond the average, HM writer Matt Morrow gave the album a full ten-out-of-ten, and Christian metal writer Johannes Jonsson rated the album three-out-of-five. Jakob Plantinga of Rocklife.nl felt that, in their retrospective opinion, while the album was good, it was not particularly innovative. The style on that album was described as black metal mixed with folk music, black and folk metal, and Viking metal. The band was compared to Amorphis and Schaliach, the latter project being the primary focus of Vardøger member Peter Dalbakk. The same year, the band played at Nordic Fest in Oslo, Norway.

In 2006, Vardøger was disbanded due to lack of interest from the musicians, although the band did play again at Nordic Fest in 2007. The band reformed the next year and began song-writing. A major lineup change occurred in 2010, and the band started recording full-length album, Ghost Notes, which was released in 2015 through Starbreather Productions. This album was received highly favorably by critics – Rocklife.nl rated the album 9.5 out of 10, and Jeffrey from Metalfan.nl rated the album 78/100. Though the band is known for playing black metal, on this release it expanded its sound to progressive metal, extreme metal, and melodic death metal. Ghost Notes was compared to the output of Kekal, Extol, Gojira, and Opeth. In 2018, Vardøger announced that it would once again disband.

Discography

Studio albums 

 Ghost Notes (2015)

Extended plays 

 Whitefrozen (2003)

Compilation appearances 

 In the Shadow of Death: A Scandinavian Extreme Music Compilation (2000) - Contributed "Footprints of Thunder"
 Come Armageddon - Endtime Productions V Years (2 Disc) (2003)
 Disc 1: LP version contains "Footprints of Thunder", CD version contains "Silent Witness"
 Disc 2: Contains "Almighty"

Band members

Final Line-up
 Peter Dalbakk – vocals (1994–1997, 2003–2006, 2007, 2008–2018) (also of Schaliach and Fleshkiller) 
 Robert Bordevik – guitar (1994–1997, 2003–2006, 2007, 2008–2018) (also of Grievance and Antestor)
 Knut Anders Sørum – vocals, keyboard (1994–2006, 2007, 2008–2018)
 Alexander Dalbakk – guitar (2010–2018)
 Johanne B. Bordevik – vocals (2010–2018)
 Henning Ramseth – bass, keyboard (2010–2018) (also of Ramzet and Return)
 Johannes Baumann – drums (2010–2018)

Former Members
 Tom Arne Fossheim – drums (1994–1997, 2003–2006, 2008–2010)
 Jo Henning Børven – drums (2003–2006, 2007) (also of Grave Declaration and Antestor) 
 Stian Aarebrot – guitar (1994–1997, 2003–2006, 2007, 2008–2010)
 Magnus Westgaard – bass (2003–2006, 2007, 2008–2010) (also of Absurd²)

References 

Norwegian unblack metal musical groups
Christian extreme metal groups
Musicians from Hamar
Norwegian folk metal musical groups
Norwegian viking metal musical groups
Norwegian progressive metal musical groups
Musical groups established in 1994
1994 establishments in Norway